Robrecht Holman (1521–1579) was the 36th abbot of Dunes.

Life
Holman was born in Sluis in 1521 and entered the Abbey of Dunes as a youth. In 1568 he was elected abbot. His abbacy was marked by the social instability arising from the opening years of the Dutch Revolt.

He died in Bruges on 29 December 1579 and was buried in an unmarked grave in the church of the Poor Clares.

Two portraits of Holman were exhibited in the 1902 Exposition des primitifs flamands à Bruges.  Some scholars attribute these works to Gillis Claeissens.

References

1521 births
1579 deaths
Abbots of Dunes
People of the Habsburg Netherlands